The  is a tramcar type operated by Tokyo Metropolitan Bureau of Transportation (Toei) on the Toden Arakawa Line in Tokyo, Japan, since 2007.

Design
The two 9000 series cars have a retro-style exterior and interior. Car 9001 is finished in a maroon and cream livery, while car 9002 is finished in a blue and cream livery.

Operations
The fleet of two cars is based at Arakawa Depot, and operates on the sole remaining tram line in Tokyo, the Toden Arakawa Line.

History
The two cars in the fleet were built between 2007 and 2009 by Alna Sharyo. The first car entered service in May 2007.

Fleet details
The individual car build histories are as follows.

References

External links

 Toden rolling stock 

Electric multiple units of Japan
Tokyo Metropolitan Bureau of Transportation
Train-related introductions in 2007
600 V DC multiple units
Alna Sharyo rolling stock